Philip Joseph Garrigan (September 8, 1840 – October 14, 1919) was an Irish-born prelate of the Roman Catholic Church who served as the first bishop of the Diocese of Sioux City in Iowa from 1902 to until his death in 1919.

Biography

Early life 
Philip Garrigan was born on September 8, 1840, in the  Whitegate, Lisduff, Virginia area of  County Cavan, Ireland. When he was still a boy, Garrigan's family immigrated to the United States, settling in Lowell, Massachusetts.  He  received his elementary education in the Lowell public schools, then went to Ellicott City, Maryland to study the classics at St. Charles's College.  After finishing at St. Charles, Garrigan studied philosophy and theology at St. Joseph's Provincial Seminary in Troy, New York,

Priesthood 
Garrigan was ordained to the priesthood for the Diocese of Springfield in Troy by Bishop David Bacon on June 11, 1870.After his ordination, Garrigan was assigned as curate of St. John's Parish in Worcester, Massachusetts. In 1873, he returned to St. Joseph's Seminary to serve as its director.  

Garrigan came back to Massachusetts in 1875 to serve as pastor of St. Bernard's Parish in Fitchburg, Massachusetts. In 1888, he was appointed as the first vice-rector of The Catholic University of America in Washington, D.C.

Bishop of Sioux City 
Pope Leo XIII appointed Garrigan as bishop of the Diocese of Sioux City on March 21, 1902.  He was consecrated by Bishop Rev. T.D. Beaven in Springfield, Massachusetts, on May 25, 1902 and installed in Sioux City on June 18, 1902.

Garrigan was a member of the National Geographic Society and the American Irish Historical Society.  He authored the article on the Diocese of Sioux City for the Catholic Encyclopedia.In 1916, Garrigan experienced a severe case of food poisoning at a banquet honoring Bishop George Mundelein in Chicago that would affect his health for the rest of his life.

Death and legacy 
Philip Garrigan died in Sioux City, Iowa on October 4, 1919, at age 79.  Bishop Garrigan High School in Algona, Iowa, was named after him.

References

Sources
This article incorporates text from the 1913 Catholic Encyclopedia article "Sioux City" by Bishop Philip Garrigan himself, a publication now in the public domain.

1840 births
1919 deaths
People from County Cavan
Irish emigrants to the United States (before 1923)
American Roman Catholic clergy of Irish descent
20th-century Roman Catholic bishops in the United States
St. Charles College alumni
Saint Joseph's Seminary (Dunwoodie) alumni
Roman Catholic bishops of Sioux City
Catholic University of America faculty
Contributors to the Catholic Encyclopedia